Gracillarioidea is a large superfamily containing four families of insects in the order Lepidoptera. These generally small moths are miners in plant tissue as caterpillars. There are about 113 described genera distributed worldwide, the most commonly encountered of which are leaf miners in the family Gracillariidae.

References
Davis, D.R, and Robinson, G.S. (1999). The Tineoidea and Gracillarioidea. In: Kristensen, N.P. (ed.), Lepidoptera, Moths and Butterflies, 1: Evolution, Systematics, and Biogeography. Handbuch der Zoologie 4 (35): 91-117. Walter de Gruyter. Berlin, New York.

External links
 Tree of Life

 
Lepidoptera superfamilies
Leaf miners